Hailey Frances Kilgore is an American actress and singer. Kilgore's breakthrough role was as Ti Moune in the Broadway revival of coming-of-age one-actstage musical Once on This Island, a performance for which the 19-year-old was nominated for the 2018 Tony Award for Best Actress in a Leading Role in a Musical, becoming one of the youngest nominees in the category.

Early life and acting career
Hailey Frances Kilgore was born in Humble, Texas. She was adopted at birth by Rebecca and Eric Kilgore of Portland, Oregon. Her family moved to the Portland suburb of Happy Valley when she was still in grade school. Kilgore began competing in pageants when she was 9. In 2012, Kilgore was named National American Miss Oregon Pre-Teen, and won the National NAM Spokesmodel competition. In 2015, she won the Miss Oregon's Outstanding Teen competition.

Kilgore attended Clackamas High School for two years, before transferring to the Clackamas Web Academy where she graduated a year early. Kilgore performed in various productions at Clackamas High School and took part in the Portland August Wilson Monologue Competition in 2014 and 2015. In 2015, Kilgore took second place in the competition and performed in the national monologue competition at the August Wilson Theatre in New York. Kilgore was a regular "capo", or chant and song leader, for the Rose City Riveters in support of the Portland Thorns FC.

Kilgore made her professional theatrical debut as Rebecca Gibbs in Portland Center Stage's production of Our Town in the fall of 2015. Kilgore appeared in the Portland Center Stage production of Ain't Misbehavin' the same year. Kilgore was a first year student at the American Musical and Dramatic Academy in New York when she was cast as Ti Moune in the Broadway revival of Once on This Island. Kilgore has also appeared on The Wayne Ayers Podcast.

Acting credits

Theatre

Film

Television

Accolades

References

External links
 
 
 

Year of birth missing (living people)
Living people
21st-century African-American women singers
21st-century American actresses
21st-century American singers
Actresses from Oregon
African-American actresses
American adoptees
American Musical and Dramatic Academy alumni
People from Happy Valley, Oregon
People from Humble, Texas
Theatre World Award winners